The 1874 Michigan gubernatorial election was held on November 3, 1874. Incumbent Republican John J. Bagley defeated Democratic nominee Henry Chamberlain with 50.37% of the vote.

General election

Candidates
Major party candidates
John J. Bagley, Republican
Henry Chamberlain, Democratic
Other candidates
Thomas E. Carpenter, Prohibition

Results

References

1874
Michigan
Gubernatorial
November 1874 events